Victor El-Kik (1936-2017) was a Lebanese Persian scholar. He is known for his works on Iran and Islam. He is a winner of Farabi International Award.

Works
 Arab culture v/s the future
 Badīʿāt al-zamān baḥṯ tārīẖī taḥlīlī fī Maqāmāt al-Hamaḏānī 	
 Beirut crossroads of civilisations
 Dictionnaire historique de l'Islam
 Fī qawāʿid al-luġaẗ al-ʿarabiyyaẗ 
 Ghazālī, Ḥujjat al-Islām
 ǧḏwr alʿrbyẗ frwʿ alḥyaẗ
 Ibn al-Muqaffaʻ adīb al-ʻaql
 lonely woman
 Ṣināʿat͏̈ al-kitābat͏̈

References

Lebanese orientalists
1936 births
2017 deaths
Iranologists
Farabi International Award recipients